The Huludao North railway station is a railway station of Qinhuangdao–Shenyang high-speed railway located in People's Republic of China.

Railway stations in Liaoning